The Jundiaí River (Portuguese, Rio Jundiaí) is a river of São Paulo state in southeastern Brazil. It is a tributary of the Tietê River, which it joins in Mogi das Cruzes.

See also
 List of rivers of São Paulo
 Tributaries of the Río de la Plata

References

Brazilian Ministry of Transport

Rivers of São Paulo (state)
Tributaries of the Tietê